Vernonella is a genus of flowering plants belonging to the family Asteraceae.

Its native range is Tropical and Southern Africa.

Species:
 Vernonella acrocephala (Klatt) H.Rob. & Skvarla 
 Vernonella africana Sond.

References

Asteraceae
Asteraceae genera